Robert Darrold Mead (born September 16, 1937) is an American politician who served as a Republican member of the New Hampshire House of Representatives. First coming to the House in 2004, he lost a bid for a second term in 2006. He was subsequently reelected in both 2008 and 2010 but resigned at the start of the 2011 legislative session to become Speaker Bill O'Brien's chief of staff.

In December 2011, Mead was named director of legislative services in the House Majority Office. He resigned the following May after a report that he used taxpayer money to fund trips to party political events.

References

External links

Republican Party members of the New Hampshire House of Representatives
1937 births
Living people
21st-century American politicians